Isabella of France (9 November 1389 – 13 September 1409) was Queen of England as the wife of Richard II, King of England between 1396 and 1399, and Duchess (consort) of Orléans as the wife of Charles, Duke of Orléans from 1406 until her death in 1409. She had been born a princess of France as the daughter of Charles VI, King of France.

Life

Isabella was born on 9 November 1389 in Paris, France as the third child and second daughter of Charles VI, King of France (Charles the Beloved/Charles the Mad) and his wife, Isabeau/Isabelle of Bavaria. Her eldest sibling had already died by the time of her birth, and the second-eldest died the following year, however, she had nine younger siblings, seven of whom survived infancy. Five of her younger siblings were only born after Isabella had already been married off to England, and one of them died while she was still there.

In 1396 negotiations started about marrying six-year-old Isabella to the widower Richard II, King of England (1367–1400), who was 22 years her senior, to ensure peace between their countries. The fact that she was a child was discussed, but King Richard said that each day would rectify that problem; that it was an advantage as he would then be able to shape her in accordance with his ideal; and that he was young enough to wait. Isabella told the English envoys (who described her as pretty) that she was happy to be Queen of England as she had been told that this would make her a great lady. She also started practising for the role.

King Richard travelled to Paris for his bride, where great festivities were held. Then, the court and the English guests went to Calais where the wedding ceremony was performed on 31 October 1396, but would not be consummated at least until the bride's twelfth birthday.

Queen of England
After the wedding Isabella went to England with her new husband, where she was moved into Windsor Castle in Berkshire. She had her own court, supervised by a governess and chief lady-in-waiting, Madame de Coucy (later replaced by Lady Mortimer). She was crowned Queen of England in Westminster Abbey in 1397. 

Although their union was an arranged political marriage, and in spite of the age difference, Isabella and Richard developed a mutually respectful relationship. Due to the age of Isabella (the Canonical law for sexual consumation being twelve), the marriage was never sexually consumated.  
However, Isabella and Richard enjoyed a good platonic relationship, which has been compared to that between a father and his adopted daughter or between a niece and a doting uncle, and he was noted to have treated her not as a wife but rather as the daughter he and his first wife Anne never had.
The king regularly visited her in Windsor, where he treated her with respect and entertained her and her ladies-in-waiting with humorous conversation, and pampered her with gifts and toys. Isabella reportedly enjoyed and looked forward to these visits. 

By May 1399 the Queen had been moved to Portchester Castle for protection while Richard went on a military campaign in Ireland. In June, Isabella's uncle, Louis I, Duke of Orléans (1372–1407) took power in France from her mentally troubled father. He decided that a peaceful relationship with France was no longer important or desirable, and let Henry Bolingbroke (1367–1413), Richard's cousin and rival, return to England. Henry's declared goal was to regain the lands of his father, John of Gaunt, Duke of Lancaster (1340–1399) who had died in February of that year, prompting King Richard to cancel the act by which Henry would have inherited his lands automatically.

Many of England's lords supported Henry, who started a military campaign and took the country without much resistance, taking advantage of Richard being in Ireland. Edmund of Langley, Duke of York, Keeper of the Realm and an uncle of both Richard and Henry, eventually also sided with the rebels. He moved Isabella first to Wallingford Castle, then to Leeds Castle. On 19 August, Richard surrendered, and he was imprisoned in London on 1 September. On 13 October 1399, Henry was crowned king. Isabella was moved into Sonning Bishop's Palace (residence of the Bishop of Salisbury) and was placed under house arrest.

On or around 14 February 1400 the deposed king died under mysterious circumstances, possibly of starvation. The French court requested that his widow be returned to France, but Henry IV wanted her to marry his son and heir, Henry of Monmouth (1386–1422). Isabella refused his demands and went into mourning for her late husband. In August 1401 she was finally allowed to return to France, but Henry IV kept her dowry, which she was supposed to get back if the marriage was never consummated. The same year, marriage negotiations were started for a match between Prince Henry and Catherine of Pomerania, Countess Palatine of Neumarkt, instead.

Duchess of Orléans
In 1406, when the marriage negotiations between the prince of Wales and Catherine of Pomerania had been terminated, Henry IV repeated his suggestion that Isabella should marry his son, but was refused by the French court. In 1420, Henry's son married Isabella's sister, Catherine of Valois. 

On 29 June 1406 Isabella, aged 16, married her paternal cousin, Charles (1394–1465), aged 11, who became Duke of Orléans in 1407 following the assassination of his father. Isabella died in childbirth on 13 September 1409 at the age of 19. Her daughter, Joan of Valois (1409–1432) survived and married John II, Duke of Alençon (1409–1476) in 1424. 

Isabella was buried in Blois, in the Abbey of Saint Laumer of Blois, where her body was discovered in 1624, wrapped in bands of linen plated with mercury. Her remains were then transferred to the Couvent des Célestins (Convent of the Celestines) in Paris, the second most important burial site for French royalty, which was desecrated during the French Revolution.

Ancestry

References

Sources

|-

Irish royal consorts
1389 births
1409 deaths
French princesses
English royal consorts
People of the Hundred Years' War
House of Valois
Ladies of the Garter
15th-century English women
People from Sonning
Deaths in childbirth
Duchesses of Orléans
14th-century French people
15th-century French people
14th-century English people
15th-century English people
14th-century French women
15th-century French women
14th-century English women
Richard II of England
Daughters of kings
Remarried royal consorts
Royal reburials